Beyond Silence is a 1960 American short documentary film directed by Edmond Levy. It was nominated for an Academy Award for Best Documentary Short. It is about Gallaudet College, a school for the deaf.

See also
 List of American films of 1960

References

External links
 
 Beyond Silence at the National Archives and Records Administration

1960 films
1960 documentary films
1960 short films
American short documentary films
1960s short documentary films
1960s English-language films
1960s American films